The E.S. Swayze Drugstore in Otisville, Michigan, also known as Otisville Mason Lodge No. 401, is a building from 1874. It was listed on the National Register of Historic Places in 1982 and designated as a Michigan State Historic Site in 2010.

History
This building was constructed to replace a previous store that burned in 1874. The second floor meeting hall was used by the Free Methodist Church  for services from 1887 to 1890. In 1903 Otisville Lodge #401 (a local Masonic lodge) purchased the building, and used it as their meeting hall. It was owned by the Masons until 1970. The lodge has moved to other premises. The building remained vacant until at least the 1980s, but was then refurbished.

Description
The E. S. Swayze Drugstore is a two-story red brick structure constructed in a vernacular Italianate style. The first floor has a double, five-panel door next to a Palladian-inspired window. Both window of which feature are set in rounded brick archways with keystones. A secondary cornice separates the first floor from the second. The second floor consists of a series of panels, containing four windows similar in to those at the first floor level. Brick corbelling runs across the cornice.

References

Italianate architecture in Michigan
Commercial buildings completed in 1874
Buildings and structures in Genesee County, Michigan
Former Masonic buildings in Michigan
Commercial buildings on the National Register of Historic Places in Michigan
Clubhouses on the National Register of Historic Places in Michigan
Michigan State Historic Sites
National Register of Historic Places in Genesee County, Michigan
1874 establishments in Michigan